Carlos Julio Arosemena Tola is a location in the Napo Province, Ecuador. It is the seat of the Carlos Julio Arosemena Tola Canton.

See also 
 Carlos Julio Arosemena Tola

References 
 www.inec.gov.ec
 www.ame.gov.ec

External links 
 Map of the Napo Province

Populated places in Napo Province